The Karry Porpoise is an electric light, commercial 4-door van designed and produced by the Chinese automaker Karry since June 2022.

Overview

The Karry Porpoise EV is an fully electric urban logistics van by Karry, specially designed for the needs of urban logistics and distribution. The same platform also spawned an ICE powered pickup truck called the Karry X6.

Specifications
The Karry Porpoise EV was built on a frame chassis with a permanent magnet synchronous electric motor positioned over the rear axle, with the output of which reaching 60 kW, and 220 Nm of torque. A 41.86 kWh lithium iron phosphate flat battery pack is located right under the floor. The Karry Porpoise EV is capable of covering 285 km on one charge. The powertrain layout of the Porpoise EV is rear-wheel drive, with MacPherson-type independent front suspension and rear-dependent leaf springs. The top speed is 80 km/hr, and the cargo space is 6.6 cubic meters.

References

External links
Official website

Porpoise
Vans
Electric vans
Cars introduced in 2022
2020s cars
Rear-wheel-drive vehicles